C-Side is a hip hop group composed of rappers Kenny Kold, King Darius (Gator), Hit James and Bo-Q.  Their single “Myspace Freak”, produced by Hit James and Jazze Pha and written by Gator was the first viral song in music history and sold some 60,000 units independently. The group's follow-up single, “Boyfriend/Girlfriend” featuring Keyshia Cole and written by Gator peaked at number 72 on the Billboard Hot 100 and number 42 on the Billboard Pop 100.   A third single, "Let's Make a Movie", was released later in 2008. The group is currently independent and recorded a 2019 single titled "Club Luv".

Singles

References

External links
 www.jeremiahint.com/press/2006/20060918_CSIDE_signing_releasephoto.pdf
 peachtreemusicgroup.com/c-side

American hip hop groups
Musical groups established in 2001
2001 establishments in Georgia (U.S. state)